The 1925 Schaumburg-Lippe state election was held on 3 May 1925 to elect the 15 members of the Landtag of the Free State of Schaumburg-Lippe.

References 

Schaumburg-Lippe
Elections in Lower Saxony